The Swedish School of Textiles was formed from the Technical School of Weaving, which was founded in 1866. In 1936 the Technical School of Weaving became the Textile Institute. In 1986 The Textile Institute was nationalised and became The Swedish School of Textiles as one of the schools at the University of Borås. In 2010 The Swedish School of Textiles was authorised to provide research-level education within Textile and Fashion (Management, Materials Technology) and Textile and Fashion (Artistic). The Swedish School of Textiles is one out of four Swedish universities with artistic research education and is unique on Textile and Fashion (Artistic).

The Swedish School of Textiles educates 933 full-time students, both in programmes and freestanding courses (2020). The school facilities feature modern lecture halls and well-equipped laboratories that cater for everything related to textiles.

Education 
The Swedish School of Textiles offer education programmes and courses in basic, advanced and research level. The bachelor's programmes in design are given in English. The master's programmes are all given in English. There's also five bachelor's programmes with Swedish as language of instructions.

Bachelor's programmes 
 Fashion Design
 Textile Design 
 Design Technician Programme
 Textile Engineering
 Textile Management and Business Administration
 Textile Product Development and Entrepreneurship
 Retail Education with Specialization in Textile and Fashion
Bachelor Programme in Textile Management, with specialization in Fashion and Retail

Master's programmes 
 Textile management
 Fashion Management and Marketing
 Textile Value Chain Management
 Fashion and Textile Design
 Textile Engineering

Doctoral education 
 Textile Management
 Textile Engineering
 Design

Webpage
Official website

References

 

Art schools in Sweden